Harvard is an English surname/family name/last name and given name/first name, derived a Middle English variant of Hereward; here (“army”) + weard (“guard”).

People with the given name
 Harvard Sitkoff (born 1945), American historian

People with the surname
 Allison Harvard (born 1988), American model and television personality
 John Harvard (clergyman) (1607–1638), English-American clergyman after whom Harvard University is named
 John Harvard (politician) (1938–2016), Canadian politician and journalist, former Lieutenant-Governor of Manitoba
 Lionel de Jersey Harvard (1893–1918), English student; descendant of clergyman John Harvard
 Russell Harvard (born 1981), American actor

References

English-language surnames
Surnames of English origin
Surnames from given names